Thomas C. Cornell (April 11, 1934 – August 1, 2022) was an American journalist and a peace activist against the Vietnam War and the Iraq War. He was an associate editor of the Catholic Worker and a deacon in the Catholic Church.

Early life and education
Cornell was born on April 11, 1934, in Bridgeport, Connecticut. He went to Fairfield University, then Fairfield College. While at Fairfield, he read The Long Loneliness, the autobiography of Dorothy Day, which inspired him to join the Catholic Worker movement.

Catholic Worker
In 1953 when Cornell was 19, he joined the Catholic Worker community in New York, where he served those in need at Maryhouse and St. Joseph House, two Catholic Worker locations in the East Village of Manhattan. He became a writer and editor for the Catholic Worker newspaper. He was the managing editor of the newspaper from 1962 to 1964. Dorothy Day gave him the job just as she was leaving on a trip to Cuba, telling him "You'll figure it out."

Activism

The Vietnam War 
Cornell led the first protest against the Vietnam War, which started with only two people from the Catholic Worker, himself and Chris Kearns, on July 16, 1963, in Union Square in New York City. In ten days their protest grew to 250 and was the first nationally televised Vietnam War protest.
 
As US military engagement was intensifying in Vietnam, Cornell founded the Catholic Peace Fellowship with Jim Forest in which they worked counseling Catholic conscientious objectors to the Vietnam War, before going on to counsel anyone with draft issues with the aid of Center on Conscience & War, an organization dedicated to defending and extending the rights of conscientious objectors, claiming a "very high" success rate. He also called the first corporate act of resistance to the Vietnam draft, when he and five others, including David McReynolds, burned their draft cards, November 6, 1965, in Union Square, New York City.

In 1967, Cornell signed a public statement declaring his intention to refuse to pay income taxes in protest against the U.S. war against Vietnam. Later, he became a sponsor of the War Tax Resistance project, which practiced and advocated tax refusal as a form of protest against the war.

In 1972, Cornell took part in a meeting which led to the establishment of Pax Christi. 

During his years of activism, Cornell was a member of the executive staff of Fellowship of Reconciliation, the executive committee of Pax Christi USA, the War Resisters League, and the Workers' Defense League.

The Iraq War 
He continued in his opposition to the Iraq War, having visited that country before the invasion in December–January 2003 and again after in 2004. His reports were published in The Catholic Worker. He urged that military chaplains be trained in the law regarding conscientious objection and give positive support to claimants.

Deacon
In 1988, Cornell was ordained a deacon in the Archdiocese of Hartford. At the Fourth World Congress in 2000, he served as Pope John Paul II's deacon at a Mass of Christ the King in St. Peter's Square.

Later life
In his retirement, he lived with his wife Monica at the Peter Maurin Farm in Marlboro, New York. He died at the age of 88 on August 1, 2022, at a nearby hospital in Poughkeepsie, New York.

Works 
  
 
 Cornell,Tom "In Defence of Catholic Worker Anarchism", the May 2010 issue of The Catholic Worker.
  Revised from an earlier version in the December 2017 issue of The Catholic Worker

See also 

 Christian anarchism
 Dorothy Day
 List of peace activists

Citations

General and cited sources 

  Revised by the same with Robert Ellsberg, Orbis, 1995

Further reading 

 
 

1934 births
2022 deaths
American anarchists
American anti-war activists
American anti–Vietnam War activists
American Christian pacifists
American tax resisters
Catholic anarchists
Catholic pacifists
Catholic Workers
Catholics from Connecticut
Catholics from New York (state)
Nonviolence advocates
Writers from Bridgeport, Connecticut
People from Marlboro, New York
Roman Catholic deacons
Fairfield University alumni